"C U When U Get There" is a song by American rapper Coolio featuring 40 Thevz. It was released in June 1997 as the first single from Coolio's third studio album, My Soul (1997). The track was also featured on the soundtrack to the 1997 comedy film Nothing to Lose. It heavily interpolates Johann Pachelbel's Baroque "Canon in D Major."

Released on June 17, 1997, the single peaked at number 12 on the US Billboard Hot 100 chart and number seven on the Billboard Hot Rap Tracks chart; it was Coolio's last top-40 hit in the US. It was also an international success, reaching the top 10 in many countries throughout Europe. The first live performance of this song was before its actual release during the free concert at Paramount Canada's Wonderland put on by MuchMusic's Electric Circus in August 1997.

Critical reception
Larry Flick from Billboard called "C U When U Get There" an "inspiring hip-hop anthem". He added, "The song's "keep pushin' on" message is direct and delivered in street-savvy language that will connect with its desired youth audience. The strong verses give way to a choir-belted chorus that adds a proper splash of emotional intensity. Factor in the track's easy-paced electro beat and a rush of stately strings, and you have the makings of a massive hit." Scottish newspaper Daily Record described it as a "superb R&B ballad".

A reviewer from Music Week rated it four out of five, noting that "Coolio goes all laid-back on this comforting, torch-like song which comes complete with an uplifting, harmony chorus." The magazine's Alan Jones commented, "Those who thought Coolio's massive hit Gangsta's Paradise was a one-off should think again: his latest single C U When U Get There is an absolute smash. Lifted from the hip-hop heavy soundtrack to the movie Nothing To Lose, it weaves a strong rap into a tapestry that also comprises Pachelbel's Canon and a sweetly singing gospel ensemble. The end result is magic and a substantial hit."

Track listings

 US CD and cassette single, Australian CD single
 "C U When U Get There" (Coolio's album version) – 5:07
 "C U When U Get There" (Bill & Humberto's orchestra mix) – 5:25

 US maxi-CD single
 "C U When U Get There" (Coolio's album version) – 5:07
 "C U When U Get There" (Ren Swan's mix) – 5:08
 "C U When U Get There" (Bill & Humberto's orchestra mix) – 5:25
 "C U When U Get There" (Humberto's alternate mix) – 5:25
 "Hit 'Em" (album version) – 4:21

 US 12-inch single
A1. "C U When U Get There" (Coolio's album version) – 5:08
A2. "C U When U Get There" (Ren Swan's mix) – 5:07
A3. "C U When U Get There" (Ren Swan's instrumental) – 5:08
B1. "C U When U Get There" (Bill & Humberto's orchestra mix) – 5:25
B2. "Hit 'Em" (album version) – 4:21

 UK CD1
 "C U When U Get There" (Bill & Humberto's orchestra mix) – 5:25
 "C U When U Get There" (Coolio's album version) – 5:08
 "C U When U Get There" (Humberto's alternate mix) – 5:25
 "C U When U Get There" (Ren Swan's mix) – 5:08

 UK CD2
 "C U When U Get There" (radio edit) – 3:40
 "Hit 'Em" (album version) – 4:30
 "The Winner" (remix) – 3:58
 "All the Way Now (Live)" (Timber mix) – 3:34

 UK cassette single and European CD single
 "C U When U Get There" (Coolio's radio edit) – 3:40
 "C U When U Get There" (Ren Swan's radio edit) – 3:57

Charts

Weekly charts

Year-end charts

Certifications

Release history

References

1996 songs
1997 singles
Coolio songs
Songs written by Coolio
Tommy Boy Records singles